Skitt Mountain is a summit in the U.S. state of Georgia.

According to tradition, the mountain's name is a corruption of the word "skit", on account of the tall tales or skits, told here by pioneer characters.

References

Mountains of Hall County, Georgia
Mountains of White County, Georgia
Mountains of Georgia (U.S. state)